Gaffelbreen is a glacier in Oscar II Land at Spitsbergen, Svalbard. It has a length of seven kilometers, and debouches into St. Jonsfjorden, from the northern side. The upper part of the glacier is split into two branches.

References

Glaciers of Spitsbergen